Annamária Kiss (born December 5, 1981) is a Hungarian former swimmer, who specialized in backstroke events. She represented Hungary in two editions of the Olympic Games (1996 and 2000), and also trained for Dunaferr Sports Club under her longtime coach and mentor Erzsébet Tóth.

Kiss made her first Hungarian team, as a 14-year-old teen, at the 1996 Summer Olympics in Atlanta. There, she failed to reach the top 16 final in the 100 m backstroke, finishing only in thirty-second place at 1:07.38.

At the 2000 Summer Olympics in Sydney, Kiss competed only in three swimming events, including a backstroke double. She achieved FINA B-standards of 1:05.16 (100 m backstroke) and 2:17.08 (200 m backstroke) from the Hungarian Championships in Budapest. On the second day of the Games, Kiss placed thirty-sixth in the 100 m backstroke. Swimming in heat two, she came up with a spectacular swim on the final stretch to race for the fourth seed in 1:06.12, just 1.13 seconds off the leading time set by Sweden's Camilla Johansson. Four days later, in the 200 m backstroke, Kiss posted a time of 2:20.40 to grab a sixth seed from the same heat, but finished only in twenty-eighth overall on the morning prelims. Kiss also teamed up with Ágnes Kovács, Gyöngyver Lakos, and newcomer Orsolya Ferenczy in the 4 × 100 m medley relay. Leading off a backstroke leg in heat one, Kiss recorded a split of 1:06.15, but the Hungarians raced to the fifth spot and thirteenth overall in a final time of 4:11.11.

References

External links
Profile – Kataca.hu 

1981 births
Living people
Hungarian female swimmers
Olympic swimmers of Hungary
Swimmers at the 1996 Summer Olympics
Swimmers at the 2000 Summer Olympics
Hungarian female backstroke swimmers
Sportspeople from Dunaújváros